This is the order of battle for the Battle of Alam el Halfa, a World War II battle between the British Commonwealth and the European Axis Powers Germany and Italy in North Africa between 30 August and 5 September 1942.

Allied forces

Eighth Army
Lieutenant-General Bernard Montgomery

XIII Corps
Lieutenant-General Brian Horrocks
 2nd New Zealand Division – Lieutenant-General Bernard Freyberg
 4th New Zealand Infantry Brigade – Brigadier Lindsay Inglis
 18th New Zealand Infantry Battalion
 19th New Zealand Infantry Battalion
 20th New Zealand Infantry Battalion
 No.4 Anti-Tank Battery, 7th Anti-Tank Regiment, New Zealand Artillery
 5th New Zealand Infantry Brigade – Brigadier Howard Kippenberger
 21st New Zealand Infantry Battalion
 22nd New Zealand Infantry Battalion
 23rd New Zealand Infantry Battalion
 No.5 Anti-Tank Battery, 7th Anti-Tank Regiment, New Zealand Artillery
 6th New Zealand Infantry Brigade – Brigadier George Clifton (captured 4 September)
 24th New Zealand Infantry Battalion
 25th New Zealand Infantry Battalion
 26th New Zealand Infantry Battalion
 No.6 Anti-Tank Battery, 7th Anti-Tank Regiment, New Zealand Artillery
 British 132nd Infantry Brigade (detached from 44th Division) – Brigadier C.B. Robertson (wounded)
 2nd Battalion, The Buffs Royal East Kent Regiment
 4th Battalion, The Queen's Own Royal West Kent Regiment
 5th Battalion, The Queen's Own Royal West Kent Regiment
 44th (Home Counties) Division – Major-General Ivor Hughes
 British 131st Infantry Brigade – Brigadier E.H.C. Frith
 1/5th Battalion, The Queen's Royal Regiment
 1/6th Battalion, The Queen's Royal Regiment
 1/7th Battalion, The Queen's Royal Regiment
 British 133rd Infantry Brigade – Brigadier Lashmer Whistler
 2nd Battalion, The Royal Sussex Regiment
 4th Battalion, The Royal Sussex Regiment
 5th Battalion, The Royal Sussex Regiment
 7th Armoured Division – Major-General James Renton
 4th Light Armoured Brigade – Brigadier Carr
 4th/8th Hussars
 11th Hussars
 12th Lancers
 1st Battalion, The King's Royal Rifle Corps
 3rd Anti-Tank Regiment, Royal Horse Artillery
 7th Motor Brigade – Brigadier Bosville
 2nd Battalion, The King's Royal Rifle Corps
 2nd Battalion, The Rifle Brigade
 7th Battalion, The Rifle Brigade
 10th Armoured Division – Major-General Alexander Gatehouse
 22nd Armoured Brigade – Brigadier George Roberts
 2nd Royal Gloucestershire Hussars
 5th Royal Inniskilling Dragoon Guards
 3rd County of London Yeomanry (Sharpshooters)
 4th County of London Yeomanry
 1st Battalion, The Rifle Brigade
 8th Armoured Brigade – Brigadier Custance
 3rd Royal Tank Regiment
 Nottinghamshire Yeomanry (Sherwood Rangers)
 The Staffordshire Yeomanry
 1st Battalion, The Buffs, Royal East Kent Regiment
 23rd Armoured Brigade – Brigadier Richards
 40th (The King's) Royal Tank Regiment
 46th (The Liverpool Welsh) Royal Tank Regiment
 50th Royal Tank Regiment
 5th Regiment, Royal Horse Artillery

Axis forces

Panzer Armee Afrika
Generalfeldmarschall Erwin Rommel

Deutsches Afrika Korps
Generalleutnant Walther Nehring (wounded in an air attack on 31 August and replaced by Rommel's Chief-of-Staff Oberst Fritz Bayerlein)
 15th Panzer Division – Generalmajor Gustav von Vaerst
 21st Panzer Division – Generalmajor Georg von Bismarck
 90th Light Division – Generalmajor Ulrich Kleemann

Italian XX Motorised Corps
Major General Giuseppe De Stefanis
 101st Motorised Division "Trieste" – Major General Francesco La Ferla
 132nd Armoured Division "Ariete" – Major General Adolfo Infante
 133rd Armoured Division "Littorio" – Major General Gervasio Bitossi

Italian X Corps
Lieutenant general Edoardo Nebbia
 17th Infantry Division "Pavia" – Major General Nazzareno Scattaglia
 27th Infantry Division "Brescia" – Major General Brunetto Brunetti
 185th Infantry Division "Folgore" – Major General Enrico Frattini

Tanks in use by both sides

Deutsches Africa Korps had 229 German and 243 Italian tanks The Germans had 27 of the Panzer IV F2the long-barreled gun 75mm gun. This longer barrelled gun gave the Mark IV superior range than the Allied tanks.
A total of 472.

The Allies had 500 that would see action during this battle. 170 of these were M3 Grants, the best tank the Allies had access to at this time. The remaining tanks were made up of M3 Stuarts light tanks, Crusader Mk II cruiser tanks and Valentine infantry tanks.
A total of 500.

Notes

References

 
 
 

Battle of Alam el Halfa
Battle of Alam el Halfa
Battle of Alam el Halfa
Battle of Alam el Halfa
1942 in Egypt